Ariff Ar-Rasyid bin Ariffin (born 28 December 1998) is a Malaysian professional footballer who plays as a defender for Malaysia Super League club Kelantan United.

References

External links
 

1998 births
People from Selangor
Living people
Malaysian footballers
Malaysia Super League players
PKNS F.C. players
UiTM FC players
Penang F.C. players
Kelantan United F.C. players
Association football defenders